Kuchanur is a panchayat town in Theni district in the Indian state of Tamil Nadu.

Geography

The perennial river Surabi flows which carried the waters of Periyar river and Suruliyaru. There is water in the Surabi river throughout the year.

Demographics
 India census, Kuchanur had a population of 6118. Males constitute 49% of the population and females 51%. Kuchanur has an average literacy rate of 59%, lower than the national average of 59.5%: male literacy is 69%, and female literacy is 49%. In Kuchanur, 11% of the population is under 6 years of age.

References

Cities and towns in Theni district